Neil Peadon was an Australian racing cyclist. He won the Australian national road race title in 1952.

References

External links

Year of birth missing (living people)
Possibly living people
Australian male cyclists
Place of birth missing (living people)